El Show de las 12 is a Puerto Rican midday variety television series airing on WKAQ-TV, and later on the nationwide Telemundo network, and hosted by Eddie Miro for most of its run.  It aired every week-day for 40 years until its cancellation on February 25, 2005.

1965 American television series debuts
2005 American television series endings
1960s American variety television series
1970s American variety television series
1980s American variety television series
1990s American variety television series
2000s American variety television series
Telemundo original programming